Max Fourny (4 August 1904 – 9 March 1991)  was a French publisher, art collector and former motor racing driver. He founded the Musée d'Art Naïf – Max Fourny in Paris, which houses an important collection of naïve paintings and sculptures from around the world. His art collection was later distributed between the museum in Paris and the International Museum of Naive Art at Vicq, near Versailles, (Fourny's former home). Fourny was married to the painter Françoise Adnet.

Complete European Championship results
(key) (Races in bold indicate pole position)

References

External links
Musée d'Art Naif, Paris
International Museum of Naive Art, Vicq (nr Versailles)

1904 births
1991 deaths
French publishers (people)
French art collectors
Naïve art
French racing drivers
European Championship drivers